is a railway station on the Kyūshū Railway Company (JR Kyūshū) Chikuhō Main Line (also known as the Wakamatsu Line) in Wakamatsu-ku, Kitakyushu, Fukuoka Prefecture, Japan.

Station layout

History 
Japanese Government Railways (JGR) opened the station on 12 August 1944 as an additional station on the existing Chikuho Main Line track. With the privatization of Japanese National Railways (JNR), the successor of JGR, on 1 April 1987, control of the station passed to JR Kyushu.

On 4 March 2017, Fujinoki, along with several other stations on the line, became a "Smart Support Station".

Surrounding area
It is the westernmost train station among four stations in Wakamatsu-ku, all of those are on the Chikuho Main Line. National Route 199 runs immediately north of the station. Other points of interest include:
 Wakamatsu Holiday Emergency Clinic - south of the station
 Nursing Home Lifeport Wakamatsu - southwest of the station
 Fujinoki Civic Center - 200m north
 Hakusan Shrine - 600m northwest
 Kitakyushu City Ishimine Junior High School - 600m west
 Kitakyushu City Fujinoki Elementary School - 800m west

References

Railway stations in Fukuoka Prefecture
Buildings and structures in Kitakyushu
Railway stations in Japan opened in 1944